The 2007 Frankfurt Galaxy season was the 15th and final season for the franchise in the NFL Europa League (NFLEL). The team was led by head coach Mike Jones in his fourth year, and played its home games at Commerzbank-Arena in Frankfurt, Germany. They finished the regular season in second place with a record of seven wins and three losses. In World Bowl XV, Frankfurt lost to the Hamburg Sea Devils 37–28. The National Football League (NFL) announced the closure of its European branch on June 29.

Offseason

Free agent draft

Personnel

Staff

Roster

Schedule

Standings

Game summaries

Week 1: vs Amsterdam Admirals

Week 2: at Cologne Centurions

Week 3: vs Hamburg Sea Devils

Week 4: at Amsterdam Admirals

Week 5: at Rhein Fire

Week 6: vs Berlin Thunder

Week 7: vs Rhein Fire

Week 8: at Berlin Thunder

Week 9: at Hamburg Sea Devils

Week 10: vs Cologne Centurions

World Bowl XV

Honors
After the completion of the regular season, the All-NFL Europa League team was selected by the NFLEL coaching staffs, members of a media panel and fans voting online at NFLEurope.com. Overall, Frankfurt had seven players selected. The selections were:

 Bobby Harris, offensive tackle
 Rhys Lloyd, placekicker
 Matt McChesney, guard
 Brandon Middleton, wide receiver
 Shirdonya Mitchell, cornerback
 J. T. O'Sullivan, quarterback
 Matt Sinclair, linebacker

Additionally, O'Sullivan was named offensive co-MVP alongside running back Derrick Ross of the Cologne Centurions. O'Sullivan started all ten games and led the league in passer rating (104.8), and passing yards (2,201) while tying for the lead with 16 touchdown passes. He completed 174 of 254 passes with seven interceptions and also rushed 31 times for 110 yards and two touchdowns.

Notes

References

Frankfurt
Frankfurt Galaxy seasons